Yahwistic may refer to:

Names named after Yahweh, see Theophory in the Bible#Yah theophory
Pertaining to the Jahwist, a hypothesized source of the Pentateuch
Pertaining to Yahwism, a hypothesized religion of the Hebrew Bible

See also
Yahweh